Peter Peters Greek: Πανούτας Πετερίδης) (born 10 June 1947) is an Australian former professional rugby league footballer, commentator and journalist.

Playing career
He was a first grade player for Parramatta (1967–68) and Manly-Warringah Sea Eagles from 1969 to 1974, playing in the 1973 premiership winning team.  He played five seasons with Manly between 1969–1974 and played over 70 grade games.

Post playing
Later he became a rugby league journalist in Fairfax newspapers and football commentator on radio station 2GB before moving to 2KY, forming a partnership with former referee Greg Hartley, which became popularly known as the 'Decibel Duo' and 'Hollywood and Zorba'. Peters was nicknamed 'Zorba' for his Greek ancestry. He was also a panelist on television programme Controversy Corner, hosted by Rex Mossop in the late 1970s.

He later became Media Manager at Manly.

Late in the 2011 NRL season, Peters was stood down by the Manly-Warringah club over a sexist comment made to a female journalist. He was later returned to the Manly Leagues Club board in 2012.

Peters is well known for his dislike of former NRL side and arch rival North Sydney.  In 2018, NSW coach Brad Fittler suggested that Manly-Warringah and Norths should once again merge to form a super club.  Peters responded to Fittler's comments by saying "On the way in I saw a couple of flying pigs, and then I checked my diary to see if it was April Fools Day, Never going to happen. It will never happen, not the North Sydney Bears.  They want to buy everyone. Gold Coast? Missed out. Brisbane team? Missed out. Perth team? Missed out.  Now Manly. They've failed every time".

References

External links
Career stats

1947 births
Living people
Australian people of Greek descent
Australian rugby league commentators
Australian rugby league journalists
Australian rugby league players
Manly Warringah Sea Eagles players
Parramatta Eels players
Rugby league players from Sydney
Rugby league second-rows